Tamil Nadu Teachers Education University is a state university located in Chennai, Tamil Nadu, which specialises in teachers' education. As on 2012, 665 colleges that are offering Bachelor of Education (B.Ed.) degree courses, are affiliated with the university. Some of these affiliated colleges are also offering Master of Education (M.Ed.) degree courses also.

History
The Government of Tamil Nadu enacted Act No.33 of 2008 to provide for the establishment and incorporation of Teachers Education University in the State of Tamil Nadu for promoting excellence in teachers education and as a division of Tamil Nadu Education council. Further the Act came into effect from 1 July 2008 by a Gazette Notification issued in G.O.M.S.256, Higher Education (K2) Department, dated 25.6.2008.

The Vice-chancellor post of the university is Prof.S.Thangasamy, Dr.S.Kalaichelvan is the present Registrar and Controller of the Examinations i/c.

See also
List of teacher education schools in India
List of Tamil Nadu Government's Educational Institutions

References

External links
 

Colleges of education in Tamil Nadu
Universities in Chennai
2008 establishments in Tamil Nadu
Educational institutions established in 2008